Amt Lenzen-Elbtalaue is an Amt ("collective municipality") in the district of Prignitz, in Brandenburg, Germany. Its seat is in Lenzen (Elbe).

The Amt Lenzen-Elbtalaue consists of the following municipalities:
Cumlosen
Lanz
Lenzen (Elbe)
Lenzerwische

Demography

References

Lenzen-Elbtalaue
Prignitz